The Japanese submarine I-31 was one of 20 Type B cruiser submarines of the B1 sub-class built for the Imperial Japanese Navy (IJN) during the 1940s.

Design and description
They displaced  surfaced and  submerged.

For surface running, the boats were powered by two  diesel engines, each driving one propeller shaft. When submerged each propeller was driven by a  electric motor. They could reach  on the surface and  underwater.

The boats were armed with six internal bow  torpedo tubes and carried a total of 17 torpedoes. They were also armed with a single /40 deck gun and two single mounts for  Type 96 anti-aircraft guns. In the Type Bs, the aircraft hangar was faired into the base of the conning tower. A single catapult was positioned on the forward deck.

Career
In November 1942, I-31 was spotted doing reconnaissance with its seaplane off Suva, Fiji.

On 12 May 1943 I-31 attacked the USS Pennsylvania and the USS Santa Fe (CL-60) with torpedoes nine miles northeast of Holtz Bay, all missed.
I-31 dove quickly but not before Edwards scored hits. The destroyers quickly made sonar contact and began a series of depth charge attacks until, after surviving for 10 hours, she was sunk by Frazier on 13 May.

Notes

References

External links

1941 ships
1943 in Alaska
World War II submarines of Japan
Japanese submarines lost during World War II
Ships built by Yokosuka Naval Arsenal
Ships of the Aleutian Islands campaign
Shipwrecks of the Alaska coast
Type B1 submarines
World War II shipwrecks in the Pacific Ocean
Maritime incidents in May 1943